The Journal of Veterinary Diagnostic Investigation is an international peer-reviewed academic journal published bimonthly in English that publishes papers in the field of Veterinary Sciences. The journal's editor is Grant Maxie, DVM, PhD, DACVP (University of Guelph). The Journal has been in publication since 1989 and is currently published by SAGE Publications in association with American Association of Veterinary Laboratory Diagnosticians, Inc.

Scope 
JVDI is devoted to all aspects of veterinary laboratory diagnostic science including the major disciplines of anatomic pathology, bacteriology/mycology, clinical pathology, epidemiology, immunology, laboratory information management, molecular biology, parasitology, public health, toxicology, and virology.

Abstracting and indexing 
The Journal of Veterinary Diagnostic Investigation is abstracted and indexed in, among other databases:  SCOPUS, PubMed/Medline, and the Social Sciences Citation Index. According to the Journal Citation Reports, its 2016 impact factor is 0.925, ranking it 64 out of 136 journals in the category Veterinary Sciences.

About the journal 
Three manuscript formats are accepted for review: Review Articles, Full Scientific Reports, and Brief Communications. Review articles are strongly encouraged provided they cover subjects of current and broad interest to veterinary laboratory diagnosticians.

JVDI also publishes position announcements for employment and advertisements for diagnostic products.

JVDI content is open access after a 12-month embargo.

This journal is a member of the Committee on Publication Ethics (COPE)

References

External links 
 
 AAVLD Official website

Veterinary medicine journals
SAGE Publishing academic journals
English-language journals